Otar is a village in the Zhambyl Region, south-eastern Kazakhstan. It is the administrative center of the Otar rural district (KATO code - 314851100). Population:

Geography
Otar is located just west of the border with the Almaty Region by the southern end of the Chu-Ili Range.   to the east of the village lies the Otar Military Base.

References

External links
Defense Minister of Kazakhstan checks Otar military base

Populated places in Jambyl Region